Gentle frying or low-temperature frying is an oil- or fat-based cooking method used for relatively fragile or starchy foods. While gentle frying is most notably used to cook fried eggs, it is also used for delicate fish, tender cuts of meat, sausages, and as a first step in fried potatoes.

Benefits
Low-temperature frying is useful if the frying fat scorches at higher heat levels (e.g. butter), or if the frying fat has flavor that the cook wants to preserve (e.g. olive oil). Overheated oils can produce unhealthy, even carcinogenic, compounds.

In starchy foods, low-temperature frying gives the starch in the food a chance to migrate and caramelize, producing a sweeter outcome.

In fragile foods such as eggs, gentle frying prevents the food from scorching or falling apart.

Disadvantages
In deep-fat frying, if done incorrectly, low temperatures may substantially increase oil absorption, leaving the food greasy, soggy, and unappetizing. However, Cook's Illustrated developed a recipe where French Fries are left in cold oil for 25 minutes as the oil is slowly heated to 138°C (280°F), and this was found to contain 30% less oil than French Fries cooked by the traditional method with oil between 163° and 177°C (325° and 350°F).

Bibliography

Cooking techniques
Culinary terminology
Fried foods